Pachygrapsus is a genus of small shore crabs. Recent genetic data suggest this genus to be possibly polyphyletic.

It comprises the following species:
Pachygrapsus corrugatus (von Martens, 1872)
Pachygrapsus crassipes Randall, 1840
Pachygrapsus fakaravensis Rathbun, 1907
Pachygrapsus gracilis (Saussure, 1858)
Pachygrapsus laevimanus Stimpson, 1858
Pachygrapsus loveridgei Chace, 1966
Pachygrapsus marmoratus (Fabricius, 1787)
Pachygrapsus maurus (Lucas, 1846)
Pachygrapsus minutus A. Milne-Edwards, 1873
Pachygrapsus planifrons De Man, 1888
Pachygrapsus plicatus (H. Milne-Edwards, 1837)
Pachygrapsus propinquus De Man, 1908
Pachygrapsus socius Stimpson, 1871
Pachygrapsus transversus (Gibbes, 1850)

References

Grapsidae
Decapod genera
Taxa named by John Witt Randall